Callicott is a surname. Notable people with the surname include:

Burton Callicott (1907–2003), American artist
J. Baird Callicott (born 1941), American philosopher
Mississippi Joe Callicott (1899–1969), American blues singer
Ransom M. Callicott (1895–1962), American businessman